Leutnant Adolf Schulte (24 December 1894—12 April 1917) IC was a German World War I flying ace credited with nine aerial victories. His short gallant career would end in a fatal midair crash with his enemies.

Early life
Adolf Schulte was born in Ludenscheit, Germany on 24 December 1894.

World War I
Schulte joined Jagdstaffel 12 in November 1916. He became its first ace during the opening months of 1917, scoring nine victories. On 12 April 1917, he first downed Edwin Hayne. He subsequently collided with a Royal Aircraft Factory FE.2d from No. 18 Squadron RAF to score his final victory, killing both himself and the British pilot and observer.

List of aerial victories
See also Aerial victory standards of World War I

Endnotes

References
 Above the Lines: The Aces and Fighter Units of the German Air Service, Naval Air Service and Flanders Marine Corps, 1914-1918. Norman Franks, Frank W. Bailey, Russell Guest. Grub Street, 1993. , .
 Albatros Aces of World War 1: Volume 32 of Aircraft of the Aces: Volume 32 of Osprey Aviation Series: Volume 32 of Osprey Aircraft of the Aces. Norman Franks. Osprey Publishing, 2000. , .
 Sopwith Pup Aces of World War 1: Volume 67 of Osprey Aircraft of the Aces: Issue 67 of Aircraft of the Aces. Norman Franks. Osprey Publishing, 2005. , .

1894 births
1917 deaths
People from Lüdenscheid
German World War I flying aces
Recipients of the Iron Cross (1914), 1st class
German military personnel killed in World War I
People from the Rhine Province
Military personnel from North Rhine-Westphalia